Elizabeth Holland  (died 1547/8), commonly known as Bess Holland,  was the mistress of Thomas Howard, 3rd Duke of Norfolk and maid-of-honour to his niece, Anne Boleyn, the second wife of Henry VIII of England. The daughter of the Duke's secretary, she  worked for eight years as a laundress in the household of Norfolk's wife, Elizabeth Stafford, Duchess of Norfolk.

The fall of Norfolk
Despite a relationship of fifteen years duration, when the Duke and his son, Henry Howard, Earl of Surrey, were arrested, Elizabeth Holland gave information which helped seal their fates. Surrey was the 'last victim of Henry VIII', being executed on the eve of the King's own death. Norfolk's execution was suspended by the King's death. He was kept in the Tower throughout the minority of King Edward VI, and was released in 1553, during the reign of Queen Mary I, whose Catholic beliefs were similar to his.

In 1547, after the Duke had been arrested, Elizabeth Holland married Henry Reppes and died in childbirth.

References

Further reading
House of Treason: the Rise and Fall of a Tudor Dynasty by Robert Hutchinson, 2009
 A Tudor Tragedy: Thomas Howard, Duke of Norfolk by Neville Williams, 1989
 The Ebbs and Flows of Fortune: Life of Thomas Howard, the Duke of Norfolk by David M. Head, 1995
Henry VIII's Last Victim: The Life and Times... by Jessie Childs, 2008

1547 deaths
16th-century English women
Year of birth unknown
English ladies-in-waiting
Household of Anne Boleyn